Sinister is a 2012 supernatural horror film directed by Scott Derrickson and written by C. Robert Cargill and Derrickson. It stars Ethan Hawke as a struggling true-crime writer whose discovery of videos depicting grisly murders in his new house puts his family in danger. Juliet Rylance, Fred Thompson, James Ransone, Clare Foley, and Michael Hall D'Addario appear in supporting roles.

Sinister was inspired by a nightmare Cargill had after watching the 2002 film The Ring. Principal photography on Sinister began in Autumn of 2011 in Long Island, NY with a production budget of $3 million. To add to the authenticity of old home movies and snuff films, the Super 8 segments were shot on actual Super 8 cameras and film stock. The film was a co-production between the United States, Canada, and the United Kingdom.

The film premiered at the SXSW festival on March 10, 2012. It was released in the United Kingdom on October 5, 2012, and in the United States on October 12. Sinister was praised by critics for its acting, direction, cinematography, and atmosphere, but received criticism for its use of jump scares and other horror clichés. The film was a box office success, grossing $87.7 million against its budget of $3 million. In the years since its release, the film has developed a reputation for its scariness and became a cult classic. A 2020 study by Broadband Choices named Sinister the scariest film ever made based on an analysis of viewer heart rates. 

A sequel was released in 2015.

Plot
True crime writer Ellison Oswalt moves into a home in the fictional town of Chatford, Pennsylvania with his wife Tracy, their 12-year-old boy, Trevor, and their 7-year-old girl, Ashley. Unbeknownst to his wife and children, Ellison has moved them into the home where the Stevenson family were murdered by hanging. He intends to write a biography about the case, to regain the fame he lost after his bestselling book Kentucky Blood was followed by two less successful novels. He hopes to learn the fate of 10-year-old Stephanie Stevenson, who disappeared following the killings.

Ellison finds a box in the attic that contains a scorpion, as well as a projector and reels of Super 8 film, each labeled as home movies. The films are footage of different families being killed in various ways, each with a related but innocuous title, such as a mass drowning marked as "Pool Party '66." Each killing is performed by the unseen camera operator. Ellison notes the appearance of a mysterious rune and a strange, eerie figure in the films. Ellison matches footage of a throat-slitting killer to news reports from St. Louis, Missouri in 1998. Three members of the Miller family were killed, while 13-year-old Christopher Miller vanished. One night, Ellison investigates noises in the attic. Inside the film reels' canister lid, he finds a king snake and childlike drawings depicting the killings, with an eerie figure called "Mr. Boogie" also present. At one point, Ellison encounters a Rottweiler in the back garden.

Ellison consults a local deputy and discovers that the filmed murders took place at different times and in different cities across the country dating back to 1966. A kid from each family disappeared following every murder. And before the Stevensons moved to Chatford, they lived in the Miller's former house. The deputy refers Ellison to occult specialist Professor Jonas, to decipher the rune in the films. Jonas relates the symbol to the ancient and obscure Babylonian god Bughuul, who would murder entire families and take one of their kids to consume their soul slowly. Jonas suspects the killings are part of a cult initiation rite, rather than the work of a single murderer. As Ellison investigates footsteps and noises throughout the home one night, it is revealed that ghost-like kids invisible to Ellison are the cause, with one of them appearing in Ashley's bedroom. Ashley later paints this girl, who she identifies as Stephanie Stevenson, on the wall. Another night, Ellison hears the film projector running and finds the missing kids seated in the attic watching one of the films. Bughuul appears on camera before physically appearing before Ellison. Ellison takes the camera, projector, and films outside and destroys them. He tells Tracy that they are moving back to their old home.

Jonas sends Ellison, now back at his old house, historical images associated with Bughuul, including the mysterious rune and three symbolic creatures that Ellison encountered at the Stevenson house: a scorpion, a snake, and a dog. Early Christians believed that images of Bughuul served as a gateway for the monster to come from the spiritual realm to the mortal world, and Bughuul can possess kids who come into contact with these images. Ellison discovers the unharmed projector and films in his attic, along with a new film labeled "Extended Cut Endings". The deputy calls Ellison and informs him that every deceased family had once lived in the house where the previous killing took place. He also learns from Professor Jonas the pattern: each new killing occurred shortly after the family moved from the crime scene into a new home, traced back to the killing of the Martinez family by arson in 1979 after they moved to Sacramento, California, from the Portland, Oregon, site of the 1966 drownings. By moving away from the Stevenson house, Ellison has marked himself and his family as the next victims. The new footage depicts the missing kids coming onscreen following each killing, revealing themselves to be the murderers under Bughuul's influence.

Ellison becomes lightheaded and notices a green liquid at the bottom of his coffee mug, along with a note from Ashley that says, "Good night, Daddy," before losing consciousness. He awakes to find himself, Tracy, and Trevor bound and gagged on the floor. Ashley, having been influenced by the spirit of Stephanie Stevenson to fall under Bughuul's control, approaches them while filming with the 8 mm camera. She tells her father that she will make him "famous again", and proceeds to kill her family with an axe. She then uses their blood to paint pictures on the walls of the hallway, along with Bughuul's rune on a door. Ashley views the film of her killings while drawing the killing in the lid of the home movies box. The missing kids stare at her through the movie but flee when Bughuul appears. He lifts Ashley into his arms and teleports into the movie. The box of films sits in the Oswalt family's attic, now accompanied by Ashley's reel titled House Painting '12. Bughuul then jumpscares the audience.

Cast
 Ethan Hawke as Ellison Oswalt
 Juliet Rylance as Tracy Oswalt
 Fred Thompson as Sheriff
 James Ransone as Deputy
 Michael Hall D'Addario as Trevor Oswalt
 Clare Foley as Ashley Oswalt

Additionally, Nick King portrays Bughuul / Mr. Boogie. Featured as the children under Bughuul's control are Victoria Leigh as Stephanie, Cameron Ocasio as BBQ Boy, Danielle Kotch as Lawn Girl, Ethan Haberfield as the Pool Party Boy, and Blake Mizrahi as Sleepy Time Boy. An uncredited Vincent D'Onofrio plays Professor Jonas.

Production

Development
Writer C. Robert Cargill says that his inspiration for Sinister came from a nightmare he experienced after seeing the 2002 horror film The Ring, in which he discovered a film in his attic depicting the hanging of an entire family. This scenario became the setup for the plot of Sinister. In creating a villain for the film, Cargill conceptualized a new take on the Bogeyman, calling the entity "Mr. Boogie". Cargill's idea was that the creature would be both terrifying and seductive to children, luring them to their dooms as a sinister Willy Wonka-like figure.

Cargill and co-writer Scott Derrickson ultimately decided to downplay the creature's alluring nature, only intimating how it manipulates the children into murder. In further developing Mr. Boogie, the pair had lengthy discussions about its nature, deciding not to make it a demon but rather a Pagan deity, in order to place it outside the conceptual scope of any one particular religion. Consequently, the villain was given the proper name "Bughuul", with only the child characters in the film referring to it as "Mr. Boogie".

Design
In crafting a look for Bughuul, Cargill initially kept to the idea of a sinister Willy Wonka before realizing that audiences might find it "silly" and kill the potential for the film becoming a series. Looking for inspiration, Derrickson typed the word "horror" into flickr and searched through 500,000 images. He narrowed the images down to 15, including a photograph of a ghoul which was tagged simply "Natalie". Cargill was particularly struck by "Natalie" and decided: "What if it's just this guy?". He and Derrickson contacted the photographer and purchased the rights to use the image for $500. Derrickson explained that the image appealed to him because it reminded him of the makeup and costumes worn by performers in black metal, while remaining unique enough so as not to be directly linked to the genre; Derrickson had previously researched black metal while looking for inspiration for Bughuul's symbol, which is ritualistically painted at the scene of each of the film's murder sequences. Some of the background music for these murder sequences was taken from ambient tracks by bands associated with the Norwegian black metal scene, including Ulver and Aghast.

Filming
Principal photography for Sinister began in autumn of 2011, after Ethan Hawke and Juliet Rylance signed on to star in the film. The Super 8 segments were shot first, using actual Super 8 cameras and film stock, in order to maintain the aesthetic authenticity of home-shot Super 8 footage. Principal photography took place on Long Island. In an interview with Bleeding Cool, screenwriter Cargill admitted that Hawke's character got his name (Ellison Oswalt) from writer Harlan Ellison and comedian/writer Patton Oswalt. Cargill keeps books by both men on his shelves.

Reception
First revealed at the SXSW festival in the United States, Sinister premiered in the United Kingdom at the London FrightFest and in Spain at the Sitges Film Festival.

Critical response
Sinister has an approval rating of 63% on Rotten Tomatoes based on 154 reviews, with an average rating of 6.20/10. The critical consensus states "Its plot hinges on typically implausible horror-movie behavior and recycles countless genre cliches, but Sinister delivers a surprising number of fresh, diabolical twists." The film also has a score of 53 out of 100 on Metacritic based on 30 critics, indicating "mixed or average" reviews.

Variety praised the film as "the sort of tale that would paralyze kids' psyches". Film.com stated that Sinister was a "deeply frightening horror film that takes its obligation to alarm very seriously". Roger Ebert gave it three out of four stars, criticizing a few obvious horror tropes but praising Hawke's performance and calling it "an undeniably scary movie." Peter Paras of E! named it the best horror film of 2012, citing the film's soundtrack and subversion of contemporary horror tropes.

CraveOnline called the film "solid" but remarked that the film "doesn't quite go to the next level that gets me like an Insidious", and IGN praised the film's story while criticizing some of Sinisters "scream-out-loud moments" as lazy.

Reviewer Garry McConnachie of Scotland's Daily Record rated the film four of five stars, saying, "This is how Hollywood horror should be done... Sinister covers all its bases with aplomb."

Ryan Lambie of Den of Geek gave the film three out of five stars, and wrote that despite its faults, "there's something undeniably powerful about Sinister. Hawke's performance holds the screen through its more hackneyed moments, and it's the scenes where it's just him, a projector, and a few feet of hideous 8 mm footage where the movie truly convinces. And while its scares are frequently cheap, it's also difficult to deny that Sinister sometimes manages to inspire moments of palpable dread."

Some reviewers have criticized the film's preoccupation with outdated technology. Peter Howell of the Toronto Star (who gave the film two out of four stars) argues that the movie tries for "old school shocks" but "can't afford a pre-Internet setting." Rafer Guzman of Newsday wrote that "celluloid is such a warm, friendly old format that it seems unlikely to contain the spirit of, say, a child-eating demon." Academic study of the film, however, tends to view Sinisters representation of both old and new media formats as a study in transmediation.

A 2020 study conducted by Broadband Choices named Sinister the scariest movie ever made. The study sampled 50 of the highest rated horror movies ever made based on reception on sites like IMDB, Rotten Tomatoes and Reddit, and then measured study participants' heart rates while watching the sampled films. The average resting heart beat of the study participants was 65 beats per minute (BPM) but jumped to an average 86 BPM while watching the film, an increase of 32% and the highest among all of the sampled films.

Home media
The film was released on DVD and Blu-ray Disc on February 11, 2013, in the UK and February 19, 2013, in the US with two commentaries (one with director Scott Derrickson and another with writer C. Robert Cargill). The release also included two new features (True Crime Criminals and Living in a House of Death) as well as a featurette on the Sinister Fear Experiment performed by Thrill Laboratory in celebration of the film's theatrical release.

Sequel

A sequel was announced to be in the works in March 2013, with Derrickson in talks to co-write the script with Cargill, but not to direct. On April 17, 2014, it was announced that Ciaran Foy would direct the film, and Brian Kavanaugh-Jones, Charles Layton, Xavier Marchand and Patrice Théroux would executive produce the sequel with eOne Entertainment. The film was released on August 21, 2015.

References

External links
 
 
 
 

2012 films
British supernatural horror films
Canadian supernatural horror films
2012 horror films
2010s mystery horror films
Alliance Films films
Lionsgate films
American ghost films
American supernatural horror films
American mystery horror films
Blumhouse Productions films
Demons in film
Films scored by Christopher Young
Films about writers
Films directed by Scott Derrickson
Films produced by Jason Blum
Films set in Pennsylvania
Films set in 2012
Films shot in Los Angeles
Films shot in New York (state)
Fiction about familicide
Films about snuff films
IM Global films
Summit Entertainment films
Films about sleep disorders
Religious horror films
Films about human sacrifice
2010s English-language films
2010s Canadian films
2010s American films
2010s British films
English-language Canadian films